2,3-Dimethylbutane is an isomer of hexane.  It has the chemical formula (CH3)2CHCH(CH3)2. It is a colorless liquid which boils at 57.9 °C.

References

Alkanes